Petrus Peckius is the name of two jurists from the Low Countries, father and son, and so
may refer to either:

Councillor Petrus Peckius the Elder (1529 — 1589)
Chancellor Petrus Peckius the Younger (1562 — 1625)